The FIBA AmeriCup (previously known as the FIBA Americas Championship) is the Americas Basketball Championship that takes place every four years between national teams of the Western Hemisphere continents.

Since FIBA organised the entire Western Hemisphere west of the Atlantic Ocean under one zone, countries from North America, Central America, the Caribbean and South America compete in this tournament.

Through the 2015 edition, the Americas Championship took place every two years, and was also a qualifying tournament for the FIBA World Cup and the Summer Olympic Games. However, since 2017, the AmeriCup, along with all other FIBA continental championships for men are played once every four years. The continental championships are no longer a part of the qualifying process for either the World Cup or Olympics.


Summaries

Notes

Medal table

Participating nations
Argentina, Brazil, Canada and Puerto Rico are the only four teams that have contested all the editions of the tournament. United States is the most successful nation with 7 titles.

Tournament awards and records

Most Valuable Player 

Most recent award winner (2022)

All-Tournament Team 

Most recent award winners (2022)

FIBA AmeriCup Top Scorer

Records

See also
FIBA World Cup
Summer Olympic Games
Pan American Games
Centrobasket
South American Championship
South American Championship for Women
FIBA Under-18 Americas Championship
FIBA Under-16 Americas Championship
FIBA Women's AmeriCup

References

External links
 

 
Basketball competitions in the Americas between national teams
Recurring sporting events established in 1980